The 2002–03 National Division One (for sponsorship reasons known as the Jewson National Division One) was the 16th full season of rugby union within the second tier of the English league system, currently known as the RFU Championship.  New teams to the division included Orrell and Plymouth Albion who were promoted from 2001–02 National Division Two while no team was relegated from the 2001-02 Zurich Premiership as Rotherham's ground was not deemed suitable for top flight games.

For the second year in a row Rotherham, were champions, and this year they were promoted to the Zurich Premiership for season 2003–04 with Worcester finishing as runners–up for the third consecutive season. Moseley and Rugby were relegated to the 2003–04 National Division Two.

Participating teams

Table

Results

Round 1

Round 2

Round 3

Round 4

Round 5

Round 6

Round 7

Round 8

Round 9

Round 10

Round 11

Round 12

Round 13

Round 14 

Postponed.  Game rescheduled to 16 February 2003.

Postponed.  Game rescheduled to 16 February 2003.

Postponed.  Game rescheduled to 21 April 2003.

Round 15 

Postponed.  Game rescheduled to 23 March 2003.

Postponed.  Game rescheduled to 16 February 2003.

Postponed.  Game rescheduled to 22 March 2003.

Postponed.  Game rescheduled to 8 March 2003.

Postponed.  Game rescheduled to 8 March 2003.

Postponed.  Game rescheduled to 16 February 2003.

Round 16

Round 17 

Postponed.  Game rescheduled to 8 March 2003.

Round 18 

Postponed.  Game rescheduled to 9 April 2003.

Round 19

Round 14 & 15 (rescheduled games) 

Game rescheduled from 11 January 2003..

Game rescheduled from 4 January 2003.

Game rescheduled from 11 January 2003.

Game rescheduled from 4 January 2003.

Round 21 (rescheduled game) 

Game brought forward from 1 March 2003.

Round 20

Round 21 

Game brought forward to 19 February 2003.

Game postponed.  Rescheduled to 8 March 2003.

Postponed.  Game rescheduled to 23 March 2003.

Postponed.  Game rescheduled to 5 April 2003.

Round 15, 17 & 21 (rescheduled games) 

Game rescheduled from 25 January 2003.

Game rescheduled from 1 March 2003.

Game rescheduled from 11 January 2003.

Game rescheduled from 11 January 2003.

Round 22

Rounds 15 & 21 (rescheduled games) 

Game rescheduled from 11 January 2003.

Game rescheduled from 11 January 2003.

Game rescheduled from 1 March 2003.

Round 23

Rounds 18, 21 & 26 (rescheduled games) 

Game brought forward from 26 April 2003.

Game rescheduled from 1 March 2003.

Game rescheduled from 1 February 2003.

Round 24

Round 25

Round 14 (rescheduled game)

Round 26 

Game brought forward to 5 April 2003.

Total Season Attendances

Individual statistics 

 Note that points scorers includes tries as well as conversions, penalties and drop goals.

Top points scorers

Top try scorers

Season records

Team
Largest home win — 99 pts
102 - 3 Rotherham at home to Moseley on 6 October 2002
Largest away win — 68 pts
75 - 7 Rotherham away to Moseley on 8 February 2003
Most points scored — 102 pts
102 - 3 Rotherham at home to Moseley on 6 October 2002
Most tries in a match — 14 (x2)
Exeter Chiefs at home to Rugby Lions on 14 September 2002
Rotherham at home to Moseley on 6 October 2002
Most conversions in a match — 10 (x3)
Rotherham at home to Moseley on 6 October 2002
Rotherham away to Moseley on 8 February 2003
Worcester away to Moseley on 22 March 2003
Most penalties in a match — 8 (x2)
Bedford Blues at home to Otley on 2 November 2002
Coventry at home to Exeter Chiefs on 9 April 2003
Most drop goals in a match — 2 (x3)
Plymouth Albion at home to Wakefield on 8 February 2003
Bedford Blues at home to Plymouth Albion on 23 March 2003
Exeter Chiefs at home to Plymouth Albion on 19 April 2003

Player
Most points in a match — 37
 Ramiro Pez for Rotherham at home to Moseley on 6 October 2002
Most tries in a match — 4 (x4)
 Drew Hickey for Orrell at home to Rugby Lions on 1 September 2002
 Dan Ward-Smith for Plymouth Albion away to Rugby Lions on 26 October 2002
 Dan Ward-Smith for Plymouth Albion at home to Manchester on 4 January 2003
 Duncan Roke for Worcester away to Rugby Lions on 26 April 2003
Most conversions in a match — 10 (x2)
 Ramiro Pez for Rotherham at home to Moseley on 6 October 2002
 Jon Benson for Rotherham away to Moseley on 8 February 2003
Most penalties in a match —  8 (x2)
 James Pritchard for Bedford Blues at home to Otley on 2 November 2002
 Luke Smith for Coventry at home to Exeter Chiefs on 9 April 2003
Most drop goals in a match —  2 (x3)
 Tom Barlow for Plymouth Albion at home to Wakefield on 8 February 2003
 Ed Barnes for Bedford Blues at home to Plymouth Albion on 23 March 2003
 Tony Yapp for Exeter Chiefs at home to Plymouth Albion on 19 April 2003

Attendances

Highest — 5,700 
Worcester at home to Rotherham on 12 April 2003
Lowest — 250 
Wakefield at home to Rugby Lions on 2 November 2002
Highest Average Attendance — 2,460
Worcester
Lowest Average Attendance — 360	
Wakefield

See also
 English rugby union system

References

2002–03 in English rugby union leagues
2002-03